The Jefferson Barracks Bridge, officially the Jefferson Barracks Memorial Arch Bridge, is a pair of bridges across the Mississippi River on the south side of St. Louis, Missouri metropolitan area. The northern bridge was built in 1983, and the southern opened in 1992. A delay occurred during the construction of the southern bridge when a crane dropped a section of it into the river and it had to be rebuilt.

The original Jefferson Barracks Bridge was a steel truss toll bridge that carried U.S. Route 50. Construction on that bridge began on August 5, 1942, and it opened two years later. A toll was charged until 1959, when the construction bonds were paid off. Prior to the construction of the original bridge, river crossings in this area were made via the Davis Street Ferry in the Carondelet neighborhood of St. Louis.

The current bridge carries traffic for both Interstate 255 (part of the St. Louis beltway) and U.S. Route 50. However, I-255 itself was not built until a few years after the northern bridge opened in 1983.

The names comes from the nearby Jefferson Barracks National Cemetery, itself originally part of the large Jefferson Barracks military complex, established in 1826 and decommissioned in 1946.

See also
List of crossings of the Upper Mississippi River

References

Road bridges in Illinois
Bridges over the Mississippi River
Interstate 55
Columbia, Illinois
Bridges completed in 1983
Bridges completed in 1992
Bridges on the Interstate Highway System
Bridges of the United States Numbered Highway System
Bridges in Greater St. Louis
Bridges in St. Louis County, Missouri
Tied arch bridges in the United States
Buildings and structures in Monroe County, Illinois
Road bridges in Missouri
U.S. Route 50
Former toll bridges in Illinois
Former toll bridges in Missouri
1983 establishments in Missouri
1983 establishments in Illinois
Steel bridges in the United States
Concrete bridges in the United States
Interstate vehicle bridges in the United States